Mrs. Jones or Miss Jones can refer to:

Mrs. Jones, full name Tulip Jones, a character in the Alex Rider media franchise
Mrs. Jones' Birthday, a 1909 film starring Fatty Arbuckles
Mrs. Jones Entertains, a 1909 film directed by D. W. Griffith
"Mrs. Jones", song by The Iveys
Miss Jones (radio personality)
Miss Jones and Son, a British comedy TV series
Mrs. Jones, a fictional character in Zig and Zag.

See also
"Me and Mrs. Jones", a song
Me and Mrs Jones (TV series)
Me and Mrs. Jones (album), a Johnny Mathis album
Jones (disambiguation)
Mr. Jones (disambiguation)